Blackstone Inc. is an American alternative investment management company based in New York City. Blackstone's private equity business has been one of the largest investors in leveraged buyouts in the last three decades, while its real estate business has actively acquired commercial real estate. Blackstone is also active in credit, infrastructure, hedge funds, insurance, secondaries, and growth equity. As of Q3 2022, the company's total assets under management were approximately US$951 billion, making it the largest alternative investment firm globally.

Blackstone was founded in 1985 as a mergers and acquisitions firm by Peter G. Peterson and Stephen A. Schwarzman, who had previously worked together at Lehman Brothers.

History

Founding and early history 
Blackstone was founded in 1985 by Peter G. Peterson and Stephen A. Schwarzman with $400,000 in seed capital. The founders named their firm "Blackstone," using a cryptogram derived from the names of the two founders (Schwarzman and Peterson). "Schwarz" is German for "black"; "Peter", "Petros" or "Petra" (Πέτρος and πετρα, the masculine and feminine rendering of the word, respectively), in Greek means "stone" or "rock". The two founders had previously worked together at Lehman Brothers. At Lehman, Schwarzman served as head of Lehman Brothers' global mergers and acquisitions business. Prominent investment banker Roger C. Altman, another Lehman veteran, left his position as a managing director of Lehman Brothers to join Peterson and Schwarzman at Blackstone in 1987, but left in 1992 to join the Clinton Administration as Deputy Treasury Secretary and later founded top advisory investment bank Evercore Partners in 1995.

Blackstone was originally formed as a mergers and acquisitions advisory boutique. Blackstone advised on the 1987 merger of investment banks E. F. Hutton & Co. and Shearson Lehman Brothers, collecting a $3.5 million fee.

From the outset in 1985, Schwarzman and Peterson planned to enter the private equity business but had difficulty in raising their first fund because neither had ever led a leveraged buyout. Blackstone finalized fundraising for its first private equity fund in the aftermath of the October 1987 stock market crash. After two years of providing strictly advisory services, Blackstone decided to pursue a merchant banking model after its founders determined that many situations required an investment partner rather than just an advisor. The largest investors in the first fund included Prudential Insurance Company, Nikko Securities and the General Motors pension fund.

Blackstone also ventured into other businesses, most notably investment management. In 1987 Blackstone entered into a 50–50 partnership with the founders of BlackRock, Larry Fink (current CEO of BlackRock), and Ralph Schlosstein (CEO of Evercore). The two founders, who had previously run the mortgage-backed securities divisions at First Boston and Lehman Brothers, respectively, initially joined Blackstone to manage an investment fund and provide advice to financial institutions. They also planned to use a Blackstone fund to invest in financial institutions and help build an asset management business specializing in fixed income investments.

As the business grew, Japanese bank Nikko Securities acquired a 20% interest in Blackstone for a $100 million investment in 1988 (valuing the firm at $500 million). Nikko's investment allowed for a major expansion of the firm and its investment activities. The growth firm also recruited politician and investment banker David Stockman from Salomon Brothers in 1988. Stockman led many key deals in his time at the firm, but had a mixed record with his investments. He left Blackstone in 1999 to start his own private equity firm, Heartland Industrial Partners, based in Greenwich, Connecticut.

The firm advised CBS Corporation on its 1988 sale of CBS Records to Sony to form what would become Sony Music Entertainment. In June 1989, Blackstone acquired freight railroad operator, CNW Corporation. That same year, Blackstone partnered with Salomon Brothers to raise $600 million to acquire distressed thrifts in the midst of the savings and loan crisis.

1990s 

In 1990, Blackstone launched its hedge funds business, initially intended to manage investments for Blackstone senior management. That same year, Blackstone formed a partnership with J. O. Hambro Magan in the UK and Indosuez in France. Additionally, Blackstone and Silverman acquired a 65% interest in Prime Motor Inn's Ramada and Howard Johnson franchises for $140 million, creating Hospitality Franchise Systems as a holding company.

In 1991, Blackstone created its Europe unit and launched its real estate investment business with the acquisition of a series of hotel businesses under the leadership of Henry Silverman. In October 1991, Blackstone and Silverman added Days Inns of America for $250 million. In 1993, Hospitality Franchise Systems acquired Super 8 Motels for $125 million. Silverman would ultimately leave Blackstone to serve as CEO of HFS, which would later become Cendant Corporation.

Blackstone made a number of notable investments in the early and mid-1990s, including Great Lakes Dredge and Dock Company (1991), Six Flags (1991), US Radio (1994), Centerplate (1995), MEGA Brands (1996). Also, in 1996, Blackstone partnered with the Loewen Group, the second largest funeral home and cemetery operator in North America, to acquire funeral home and cemetery businesses. The partnership's first acquisition was a $295 million buyout of Prime Succession from GTCR.

In 1995, Blackstone sold its stake in BlackRock to PNC Financial Services for $250 million. Between 1995 and 2014, PNC reported $12 billion in pretax revenues and capital gains from BlackRock, Schwarzman later described the selling of BlackRock as his worst business decision ever.

In 1997, Blackstone completed fundraising for its third private equity fund, with approximately $4 billion of investor commitments and a $1.1 billion real estate investment fund. Also in 1997, Blackstone made its first investment in Allied Waste. In 1998, Blackstone sold a 7% interest in its management company to AIG, valuing Blackstone at $2.1 billion. In 1999, Blackstone partnered, together with Apollo Management to provide capital for Allied Waste's acquisition of Browning-Ferris Industries. Blackstone's investment in Allied was one of its largest at that point in the firm's history.

In 1999, Blackstone launched its mezzanine capital business. Blackstone brought in five professionals, led by Howard Gellis from Nomura Holding America's Leveraged Capital Group to manage the business.

Blackstone's investments in the late 1990s included AMF Group (1996), Haynes International (1997), American Axle (1997), Premcor (1997), CommNet Cellular (1998), Graham Packaging (1998), Centennial Communications (1999), Bresnan Communications (1999), PAETEC Holding Corp. (1999). Haynes and Republic Technologies International,  both had problems and ultimately filed bankruptcy.

Blackstone's investments in telecommunications businesses—four cable TV systems in rural areas (TW Fanch 1 and 2, Bresnan Communications and Intermedia Partners IV) and a cell phone operator in the
Rocky Mountain states (CommNet Cellular) were among the most successful of the era, generating $1.5 billion of profits for Blackstone's funds.

Blackstone Real Estate Advisers, its real estate affiliate, bought the Watergate complex in Washington D.C. in July 1998 for $39 million and sold it to Monument Reality in August 2004.

Early 2000s 
In October 2000, Blackstone acquired the mortgage for 7 World Trade Center from the Teachers Insurance and Annuity Association.

In July 2002, Blackstone completed fundraising for a $6.45 billion private equity fund, Blackstone Capital Partners IV, the largest private equity fund at that time.

With a significant amount of capital in its new fund, Blackstone was one of a handful of private equity investors capable of completing large transactions in the adverse conditions of the early 2000s recession. At the end of 2002, Blackstone, together with Thomas H. Lee Partners and Bain Capital, acquired Houghton Mifflin Company for $1.28 billion. The transaction represented one of the first large club deals completed since the collapse of the Dot-com bubble.

In 2002, Hamilton E. James joined global alternative asset manager Blackstone, where he currently serves as president and chief operating officer. He also serves on the firm's executive and management committees, and its board of directors. In late 2002, Blackstone remained active acquiring TRW Automotive in a $4.7 billion buyout, the largest private equity deal announced that year (the deal was completed in early 2003). TRW's parent was acquired by Northrop Grumman, while Blackstone purchased its automotive parts business, a major supplier of automotive systems. Blackstone also purchased a majority interest in Columbia House, a music-buying club, in mid-2002.

Blackstone made a significant investment in Financial Guaranty Insurance Company (FGIC), a monoline bond insurer alongside PMI Group, The Cypress Group and CIVC Partners. FGIC incurred heavy losses, along with other bond insurers in the 2008 credit crisis.

Two years later, in 2005, Blackstone was one of seven private equity firms involved in the buyout of SunGard in a transaction valued at $11.3 billion. Blackstone's partners in the acquisition were Silver Lake Partners, Bain Capital, Goldman Sachs Capital Partners, Kohlberg Kravis Roberts, Providence Equity Partners, and TPG Capital. This represented the largest leveraged buyout completed since the takeover of RJR Nabisco at the end of the 1980s leveraged buyout boom. Also, at the time of its announcement, SunGard would be the largest buyout of a technology company in history, a distinction it would cede to the buyout of Freescale Semiconductor. The SunGard transaction is also notable in the number of firms involved in the transaction, the largest club deal completed to that point. The involvement of seven firms in the consortium was criticized by investors in private equity who considered cross-holdings among firms to be generally unattractive.

In 2006, Blackstone launched its long/short equity hedge fund business, Kailix Advisors. According to Blackstone, as of September 30, 2008, Kailix Advisors had $1.9 billion of assets under management. In December 2008, Blackstone announced that Kailix would be spun off to its management team to form a new fund as an independent entity backed by Blackstone.

While Blackstone was active on the corporate investment side, it was also busy pursuing real estate investments. Blackstone acquired Prime Hospitality and Extended Stay America in 2004. Blackstone followed these investments with the acquisition of La Quinta Inns & Suites in 2005.  Blackstone's largest transaction, the $26 billion buyout of Hilton Hotels Corporation occurred in 2007 under the tenure of Hilton CFO Stephen Bollenbach. Extended Stay Hotels was sold to The Lightstone Group in July 2007 and Prime Hospitality's Wellesley Inns were folded into La Quinta. La Quinta Inns & Suites was spun out for IPO in 2014 and was later acquired by Wyndham Hotels & Resorts

Buyouts (2005–2007) 
During the buyout boom of 2006 and 2007, Blackstone completed some of the largest leveraged buyouts. Blackstone's most notable transactions during this period included the following:

Initial public offering in 2007 
In 2004, Blackstone had explored the possibility of creating a business development company (BDC), Blackridge Investments, similar to vehicles pursued by Apollo Management. However, Blackstone failed to raise capital through an initial public offering that summer and the project were shelved. It also planned to raise a fund on the Amsterdam stock exchange in 2006, but its rival, Kohlberg Kravis Roberts & Co., launched a $5 billion fund there that soaked up all demand for such funds, and Blackstone abandoned its project.

In 2007, Blackstone acquired Alliant Insurance Services, an insurance brokerage firm. The company was sold to Kohlberg Kravis Roberts in 2012.

On June 21, 2007, Blackstone became a public company via an initial public offering, selling a 12.3% stake in the company for $4.13 billion, in the largest U.S. IPO since 2002.

2008 to 2010 
During the financial crisis of 2007–2008, Blackstone managed to close only a few transactions. In January 2008, Blackstone made a small co-investment alongside TPG Capital and Apollo Management in their buyout of Harrah's Entertainment, although that transaction had been announced during the buyout boom period. Other notable investments that Blackstone completed in 2008 and 2009 included AlliedBarton, Performance Food Group, Apria Healthcare and CMS Computers.

In July 2008, Blackstone, together with NBC Universal and Bain Capital acquired The Weather Channel from Landmark Communications for $3.5 billion. In 2015, the digital assets were sold to IBM for $2 billion. In 2018, the remainder of the company was sold to Byron Allen for $300 million.

In December 2009, Blackstone acquired Busch Entertainment Corporation from Anheuser-Busch InBev for $2.9 billion.

In November 2013, Merlin Entertainments, owned in part by Blackstone Group, became a public company via an initial public offering on the London Stock Exchange.

In August 2010, Blackstone announced it would buy Dynegy, an energy firm, for nearly $5 billion; however, the acquisition was terminated in November 2010.

Investments 2011 to 2015 
 In February 2011, the company acquired Centro Properties Group US from Centro Retail Trust (now Vicinity Centres) for $9.4 billion. The company became Brixmor Property Group and Blackstone sold its remaining interest in the company in August 2016.
 In November 2011, a fund managed by the company acquired medical biller Emdeon for $3 billion.
 In late 2011, Blackstone Group LP acquired Jack Wolfskin, a German camping equipment company. In 2017, the company was handed over to its lenders.
 In August 2012, Blackstone was part of a consortium that financed Knight Capital after a software glitch threatened Knight's ability to continue operations.
 In October 2012, the company acquired G6 Hospitality, operator of Motel 6 & Studio 6 motels from AccorHotels, for $1.9 billion.
 In November 2012, the company acquired a controlling interest in Vivint, Vivint Solar, and 2GIG Technologies. In February 2013, 2GIG was flipped to Nortek Security & Control, LLC for $135M.
 In April 2013, the company discussed buying Dell, but it did not pursue the acquisition.
 In June 2013, Blackstone Real Estate Partners VII acquired an industrial portfolio from First Potomac Realty Trust for $241.5 million. Part of this portfolio was developed by StonebridgeCarras as Oakville Triangle (Now "National Landing")
 In September 2013, Blackstone announced a strategic investment in ThoughtFocus Technologies LLC, an information technology service provider.
 In August 2013, Blackstone acquired Strategic Partners, manager of secondaryfunds, from Credit Suisse.
 In February 2014, Blackstone purchased a 20% stake in the Italian luxury brand Versace for €150 million.
 In April 2014, Blackstone's charitable arm, the Blackstone Charitable Foundation, donated $4 million to create the Blackstone Entrepreneurs Network in Colorado. The program encourages increased collaboration among local business leaders with the goal of retaining high-growth companies in the state.
 In May 2014, Blackstone Group acquired the Cosmopolitan of Las Vegas resort from Deutsche Bank for $1.73 billion.
 In August 2014, Blackstone Energy Partners acquired Shell Oil's 50% stake in a shale-gas field in the Haynesville Shale for $1.2 billion.
 In January 2015, Blackstone Real Estate Partners VI announced it would sell a Gold Fields House in Sydney to Dalian Wanda Group for A$415 million.
 In June 2015, Blackstone acquired the Willis Tower in Chicago for $1.3 billion.
 In July 2015, Blackstone acquired Excel Trust, a real estate investment trust, for around $2 billion.
 In November 2015, the company agreed to sell facility management firm GCA Services Group to Goldman Sachs and Thomas H. Lee Partners.

Investments since 2016 
 In January 2016, Blackstone Real Estate Partners VIII L.P. acquired BioMed Realty Trust for $8 billion.
 In February 2016, Blackstone sold four office buildings to Douglas Emmett for $1.34 billion.
 In April 2016, Blackstone acquired 84 percent of Hewlett-Packard Enterprise's stake in the Indian IT services firm Mphasis.
 On January 4, 2017, Blackstone acquired SESAC, a music-rights organization.
 On February 10, 2017, Aon PLC agreed to sell its human resources outsourcing platform for $4.3 billion to Blackstone Group L.P., creating a new company called Alight Solutions.
 On June 19, 2017, Blackstone acquired a majority interest in The Office Group, valuing the company at $640 million.
 In July 2017, the company announced an investment in Leonard Green & Partners.
 In January 2018, the company acquired Pure Industrial, a Canadian real estate investment trust for C$2.5 billion.
 In January 2018, the company announced acquisition agreement for 55% of Thomson Reuters Financial & Risk unit for $20 billion.
 In March 2018, Blackstone Real Estate Income Trust, Inc. acquired a 22 million square foot portfolio of industrial properties from Cabot Properties for $1.8 billion.
 In March 2018, Blackstone's Strategic Capital Holdings Fund invested in Rockpoint Group.
 In March 2018, the company's Strategic Capital Holdings Fund announced an investment in Kohlberg & Company, a private equity firm.
 In September 2018, the company acquires control of Luminor Bank in the Baltic countries.
 In October 2018, Blackstone launched Refinitiv, the company resulting from its January deal for a 55 per-cent stake in Thomson Reuters Financial and Risk business.
 In October 2018, Blackstone announced to buy Clarus. The deal includes assets worth $2.6 billion.
 In March 2019, Blackstone purchased, with Yankee Global Enterprises, a minority stake in YES Network.
 In April 2019, Blackstone acquired a majority stake in the tube packaging company, Essel Propack for $310 million.
 In June 2019, Blackstone announced it had teamed with the Canada Pension Plan Investment Board and KIRKBI to buy Merlin Entertainment, the owners of Legoland in a deal worth £5.9 billion (about $7.5 billion). This would be the 2nd time Blackstone would own the company as they previously purchased it in 2005.
 On July 15, 2019, Blackstone announced its plans to acquire Vungle Inc., a leading mobile performance marketing platform.
 In September 2019, Blackstone announced it agreed to purchase 65% controlling interest in Great Wolf Resorts from Centerbridge Partners. They plan to form a joint venture worth $2.9 billion or more to own the company.
 On November 8, 2019, Blackstone Group acquired a majority stake in MagicLab, the owner of dating app Bumble.
 Blackstone Group on November 15, 2019, invested $167 million in the holding company of Future Lifestyle Fashions Ltd., Ryka Commercial Ventures Pvt. Ltd.
 On November 18, 2019, Blackstone Real Estate Income Trust, Inc. acquired the Bellagio resort in Las Vegas, Nevada from MGM Resorts in a sale-leaseback transaction.
 On November 25, 2019, Reuters reported that Blackstone planned to invest $400 million in a joint venture with Swiss drug company Ferring. The joint venture will work on gene therapy for bladder cancer. The investment represents Blackstone Group's largest investment in drug development to date.
 In March 2020, Blackstone announced that it is buying a majority stake in HealthEdge, a health-care software company. The deal worth $700 million was completed on April 13, 2020.
In July 2020, Blackstone invested US$200m in the Swedish oat milk brand, Oatly, for a 7% stake in the company, triggering outrage among some segments of its customer base.
 In August 2020, Blackstone announced that it will buy a majority stake in Ancestry.com for $4.7 billion (including debt).
 In August 2020, Blackstone acquired Takeda Consumer Healthcare for $2.3 billion.
 In December 2020, Blackstone invested nearly $400 million in Liftoff, a mobile advertising company.
In January 2021, Blackstone acquired a majority shareholding in Bourne Leisure, a UK holiday and leisure company which owns Butlin's, Haven Holidays, and Warner Leisure, for £3 billion.
 In March 2021, Blackstone made a $6.2 billion takeover bid for Australian casino operator Crown Resorts, offering a 20% premium to its closing share price at the time of the offer. Blackstone held at the time a near 10% stake in the company.
 In April 2021, Blackstone acquired  eOne music from  Hasbro  for $385 million.
 In July 2021, MGM Resorts International announced it sold Aria Resort and Casino and Vdara to Blackstone for $3.89 billion in a sale-leaseback transaction.
In July 2021, Blackstone Group and AIG announced that the company would acquire 9.9% of AIG’s life and retirement insurance investment portfolio, for $2.2 billion cash, during AIG’s spin-off of the unit by IPO in 2022. The two firms also entered a long-term asset management agreement for about 25% of AIG’s life and retirement portfolio, scheduled to increase in subsequent years.
 In August 2021, the merger of two Blackstone portfolio companies, Vungle and Liftoff, was announced. Both companies are in the mobile advertising space.
 In October 2021, the Blackstone Group acquired a majority stake of Spanx, Inc. The company was valued at US$1.2 billion. The deal was prepared by an all-female investment team from Blackstone, and it was announced that the Board of Directors would be all-female.
In October 2021, Blackstone acquired the Nucleus Network, Australia's premier clinical researcher, who are providing staple 'healthy' volunteers large financial rewards for drug trials. 
On February 14, 2022 Crown Resorts accepted Blackstone's takeover offer. Blackstone will pay US$6.6 billion for 90% of shares outstanding.
In April 2022, Blackstone agreed to acquire the Austin-based American Campus Communities, Inc. for nearly $13 billion.
In April 2022, Blackstone announced that it would acquire PS Business Parks for $7.6 billion.
In October 2022, Emerson Electric agreed to sell a 55 percent majority stake in its climate technologies business to Blackstone in a $14billion deal including debt.

Operations 
Blackstone operates through four primary departments: private equity; real estate; hedge funds; and credit.

Corporate private equity 

, Blackstone was the world's largest private equity firm by capital commitments as ranked by Private Equity International. The firm invests through minority investments, corporate partnerships, and industry consolidations, and occasionally, start-up investments. The firm focuses on friendly investments in large capitalization companies.

Blackstone has primarily relied on private equity funds, pools of committed capital from pension funds, insurance companies, endowments, fund of funds, high-net-worth individuals, sovereign wealth funds, and other institutional investors. From 1987 to its IPO in 2007, Blackstone invested approximately $20 billion in 109 private equity transactions.

Blackstone's most notable investments include Allied Waste, AlliedBarton Security Services, Graham Packaging, Celanese, Nalco, HealthMarkets, Houghton Mifflin, American Axle, TRW Automotive, Catalent Pharma Solutions, Prime Hospitality, Legoland, Madame Tussauds, Luxury Resorts (LXR), Pinnacle Foods, Hilton Hotels Corporation, Motel 6, Apria Healthcare, Travelport, The Weather Channel (United States) and The PortAventura Resort. In 2009, Blackstone purchased Busch Entertainment (comprising the Sea World Parks, Busch Garden Parks and the two water parks). In 2020 they acquired Ancestry.com.

In 2012, Blackstone acquired a controlling interest in Utah-based Vivint, Inc., a home automation, security, and energy company.

Real estate 

Blackstone's most notable real estate investments have included EQ Office, Hilton Worldwide, Trizec Properties, Center Parcs UK, La Quinta Inns & Suites, Motel 6, Wyndham Worldwide, Southern Cross Healthcare and Vicinity Centres.

The purchase and subsequent IPO of Southern Cross led to controversy in the UK. Part of the purchase involved splitting the business into a property company, NHP, and a nursing home business, which Blackstone claimed would become "the leading company in the elderly care market". In May 2011, Southern Cross, now independent, was almost bankrupt, jeopardizing 31,000 elderly residents in 750 care homes. It denied blame, although Blackstone was widely accused in the media for selling on the company with an unsustainable business model and crippled with an impossible sale and leaseback strategy.

After the 2007–2010 subprime mortgage crisis in the United States, Blackstone Group LP bought more than $5.5 billion worth of single-family homes to rent, and then be sold when the prices rise.

In 2014, Blackstone sold Northern California office buildings for $3.5 billion. The buildings sold in San Francisco and Silicon Valley included 26 office buildings and two development parcels.

In 2018, a critique was raised regarding a purchase agreement on several hundred apartments in Frederiksberg, Denmark, between Blackstone's Danish partner North 360 and Frederiksberg Boligfond, a non-profit housing organization established by Frederiksberg Municipality in 1930. After a resistance of residents and questions regarding the legality of the purchase agreement, Blackstone withdrew from it in October 2019.

On December 1, 2022, Blackstone Inc. restricted withdrawals from its $125 billion real estate investment fund BRIET due to a surge in redemption requests from investors. The move caused investor consternation and limited the ability to attract new capital for BRIET.

Marketable alternative asset management 
In 1990, Blackstone created a fund of hedge funds business to manage internal assets for Blackstone and its senior managers. This business evolved into Blackstone's marketable alternative asset management segment, which was opened to institutional investors. Among the investments included in this segment are funds of hedge funds, mezzanine funds, senior debt vehicles, proprietary hedge funds and closed-end mutual funds.

In March 2008, Blackstone acquired GSO Capital Partners, a credit-oriented alternative asset manager, for $620 million in cash and stock and up to $310 million through an earnout over the next five years based on earnings targets. The combined entity created one of the largest credit platforms in the alternative asset management business, with over $21 billion under management. GSO was founded in 2005 by Bennett Goodman, Tripp Smith, and Doug Ostrover. The GSO team had previously managed the leveraged finance businesses at Donaldson, Lufkin & Jenrette and later Credit Suisse First Boston, after they acquired DLJ. Blackstone had been an original investor in GSO's funds. Following the acquisition, Blackstone merged GSO's operations with its existing debt investment operations.

Criticism 
In separate cases in 2018 and 2019, the hotel chain Motel 6, owned by Blackstone, agreed to settle for a total of $19.6 million for giving guest lists to U.S. Immigration and Customs Enforcement (ICE) without a warrant.

Deforestation of the Amazon rainforest 
The company has invested in companies with links to the commercialization and deforestation of the Amazon rainforest.

United Nations condemnation of the Invitation Homes project and lobbying efforts 
In 2019, a United Nations report found that Blackstone's massive purchasing of single-family homes after the financial crisis of 2007–2008 had "devastating consequences." The report alleged that Blackstone had abused tenants with exorbitant fees, rent hikes, and aggressive eviction practices, and that Blackstone's real estate practices had a disproportionate impact on communities of color, in part because the company targeted foreclosures resulting from subprime loans.

The report also condemned Blackstone for "using its significant resources and political leverage to undermine domestic laws and policies that would in fact improve access to adequate housing." Blackstone spent at least $6.2 million to defeat California's Proposition 10, which would have allowed cities to enact rent control. Blackstone is a member of the Real Estate Roundtable, a special interest group which spends millions on lobbying and political donations every year.

United Nations housing rapporteur Leilani Farha and Surya Deva, chair of the UN Working Group on Business and Human Rights, criticized Blackstone's business practices, including frequent rent increases and "aggressive" evictions, for contributing to the global housing crisis. Blackstone disputed these claims.

Leadership

Executives 
Source:
 Stephen A. Schwarzman: chairman, CEO & co-founder
 Jonathan D. Gray: president & COO
 Hamilton E. James: executive vice chairman
 Joseph Baratta: Global Head of private equity
 David S. Blitzer: Global Head of tactical opportunities

Board of directors 
 Stephen A. Schwarzman: chairman of the board of directors and the executive committee
 Hamilton E. James: a member of the executive committee
 Jonathan D. Gray: a member of the executive committee
 Joseph Baratta: a member of the executive committee
 James W. Breyer: independent director & member of the audit committee and the conflicts committee
 Rochelle B. Lazarus: independent director & member of the audit committee and the conflicts committee
 Jay O. Light: independent director & member of the audit committee and the conflicts committee
 The Right Honorable Brian Mulroney: independent director
 William G. Parrett: independent director & chairman of the audit committee and the conflicts committee
 Ruth Porat: independent director
 Reginald ("Reg") J. Brown: independent director

See also 

 List of outdoor industry parent companies
 List of venture capital firms

References

External links
 
 

 
1985 establishments in New York (state)
American companies established in 1985
2007 initial public offerings
Companies listed on the New York Stock Exchange
Financial services companies based in New York City
Financial services companies established in 1985
Hedge fund firms in New York City
Investment banks in the United States
Investment companies based in New York City
Private equity firms of the United States
Venture capital firms of the United States
Publicly traded companies based in New York City